HD 87883 is star in the northern constellation of Leo Minor. It is too faint to be viewed with the naked eye, having an apparent visual magnitude of 7.56. The star is located at a distance of 59.7 light years from the Sun based on parallax, and is drifting further away with a radial velocity of +9.3 km/s. It has an absolute magnitude of 6.27.

This is an ordinary K-type main-sequence star with a stellar classification of K0V. It has a modest level of chromospheric activity, and is rotating with a period of 38.6 days. The star is smaller than the Sun, with 82% of the mass of the Sun and 76% of the Sun's radius. The age of this star is 9.8 billion years, compared with 4.6 billion years for the Sun. It is radiating 32% of the luminosity of the Sun from its photosphere at an effective temperature of 4,980 K.

In August 2009, this star was found to have a planet via the radial velocity method. A relatively high deviation on the model fit suggests there may be an additional planetary companion in a close, perturbing orbit of the star. The orbital parameters of the known planet do not preclude the existence of an Earth-mass planet with a dynamically-stable orbit in the habitable zone.

See also 
 List of extrasolar planets

References

K-type main-sequence stars
Planetary systems with one confirmed planet
Leo Minor
087883
049699
Durchmusterung objects